Fire Pro Wrestling Returns, known in Japan as , is a professional wrestling video game that was released in 2005 in Japan, and was released on November 13, 2007 in North America and February 8, 2008 in Italy, Spain and Portugal. The game is part of the Fire Pro Wrestling series.

Gameplay

Like other titles in the Fire Pro Wrestling series, Fire Pro Wrestling Returns distinguishes itself from other wrestling games by focusing on timing and strategy, as opposed to button-mashing. Fire Pro Wrestling Returns offers a roster of 327 wrestlers from a variety of real-life wrestling companies. Players can create custom characters, wrestling rings, belts, promotions, and referees. Returns supplies new customizing tools, such as a "Face Layer" feature that allows players to create a wrestler's face using multiple objects. Game modes include a traditional cage match, Exploding Barbed Wire Deathmatch, and Match Maker mode, wherein the player must book shows and try to get a good grade on the shows based on crowd reaction.

Reception

The game received "generally favorable reviews" according to the review aggregation website Metacritic. In Japan, Famitsu gave it a score of 31 out of 40.

See also

List of licensed wrestling video games
List of fighting games

References

External links

 Official North American website
 

2005 video games
Fire Pro Wrestling
PlayStation 2 games
PlayStation Network games
Video games developed in Japan
Video games scored by Atsuhiro Motoyama
Professional wrestling games
505 Games games
Multiplayer and single-player video games
Agetec games